World Series of Fighting 12: Palomino vs. Gonzalez was a mixed martial arts event held on August 9, 2014, in Paradise, Nevada, United States. The event also aired on NBCSN.

Background
The event was originally scheduled to take place on August 2, 2014, in Tokyo, Japan.

Krasimir Mladenov was expected to face Elvis Mutapčić at the event, However Mladenov pulled out of the bout due to an injury and was replaced by Kelvin Tiller. Tiller was originally scheduled to face Ronny Markes at the event, Markes instead faced promotional newcomer Cully Butterfield.

Results

See also 
 World Series of Fighting
 List of WSOF champions
 List of WSOF events

References

Events in Paradise, Nevada
World Series of Fighting events
2014 in mixed martial arts
Sports competitions in Las Vegas
2014 in sports in Nevada
Hard Rock Hotel and Casino (Las Vegas)